Below is a list of notable footballers who have played for SV Eintracht Trier 05

Famous players

Notable players

Liridon Binakaj
Shergo Biran
Dibran Thaqi

Peter Buljan
David Zdrilic

Ilham Mammadov

Miodrag Latinović
Faris Efendić
Adnan Kevrić
Nihad Mujakić

Antonio da Silva

Jaja Diakite

Rodalec Souza

Brahaman Sinisterra

Igor Budisa
Dario Krešić
Antun Labak
Zoran Mamić
Marijo Maric
Alen Milak
Pero Miletic
Denis Novacic
Vlado Papic

Sammy Habte

Francis Laurent
Philippe Stelletta
Pierre Valerius

David Siradze

Florian Bauer
Roland Benschneider
Reinhold Breu
Frank Buschmann
Jakob Dallevedove
Dirk de Wit
Matthias Dworschak
Dirk Fengler
David Fuhl
Fabio Fuhs
Dennis Giese
Matthias Hamann
Christian Hassa
Werner Heinzen
Mario Herres
Steffen Herzberger
Kai Hillmann
Daniel Ischdonat
Axel Keller
Marcus Koster
Michael Krempchen
Maurice Kress
Peter Klaus
Ronny Kockel
Markus Lösch
Stefan Malchow
Dominik Müller
Runald Ossen
Markus Osthoff
Nico Patschinski
Sebastian Pelzer
Sebastian Radtke
Jens Robben
Andreas Saur
Edgar Schmitt
Stephan Straub
Frank Thieltges
Rudi Thömmes
Marco Toppmöller
Niki Wagner
Michael Weuffen
Sebastian Ting
Daniel Winkler

Lawrence Adjei
Joseph Annor Aziz
Edwin Bediako
Kwaku Kyere

 Bruno Gomis

 Vitus Nagorny

Shpend Hayredini
Ali Parhizi

Fabio Cornely
Angelo Donato
Luca Greco
Gustav Policella
Frank Prunella
Philipp Regneri

Nobutaka Suzuki

Mehmet Dragusha
Emin Ismaili

Achmed Boussi

Josephus Yenay

Gilles Kettels
Robert Langers
Tom Schnell

 Moussa Touré

Erkan Amedovski

Angus Ikeji
Amodou Abdullei

Marek Czakon
Benjamin Gorka
Claus Grzeskowiak
Thomas Kempny
Grzegorz Wiezik

Victor Lopes

Alexandru Balota
Christian Barbian
Catalin Racanel

Petar Divić
Milan Drageljevic
Ermin Melunović
Vitomir Milosevic

Zouhair Bouadoud
Najeh Braham
Samir Louadj

Mevlüt Yildirim
Hasan Vural

Artur Poloshenko

Charlie Rugg

References

Players
 
Eintracht Trier
Association football player non-biographical articles